Phillip S. Berry (1937–2013) was national President of the Sierra Club.

Biography 
Born January 30, 1937, in Berkeley, California, he graduated from Berkeley High (1954), Stanford University (1958) and Stanford Law (1961).  He began his law career with his father Samuel Berry's firm, before they formed the Law Offices of Berry & Berry in Oakland, California. He  died September 22, 2013, in Lafayette, CA.

Sierra Club 
In addition to  becoming President of the Sierra Club, he had been National Board Member, Co-founder of Sierra Club Legal Defense later Earth Justice, and a John Muir Award Winner. He served as the Sierra Club's National President twice, first from 1969-1971, then later from 1991-1992.  He served on the Sierra Club's National Board for 30 years.  In 1971, he co-founded Sierra Club Legal Defense later Earth Justice along with Fred Fisher and Don Harris.  He was awarded the Sierra Club John Muir Award, its highest honor, in 1978.

References

External links 
 www.example.com

1937 births
2013 deaths
Lawyers from Berkeley, California
Stanford University alumni
Stanford Law School alumni
Sierra Club presidents
Sierra Club awardees
20th-century American lawyers